John Gordon Groce (born September 7, 1971) is an American college basketball coach, currently the head coach for the Akron Zips men's basketball team. Prior to coaching for Akron, he was the head coach at Illinois and Ohio.

Coaching career

Player and assistant coach

Groce graduated from Taylor University, an NAIA Division II school in Upland, Indiana, in 1994 and played basketball for the school while he was there. Groce started his coaching career as an assistant with his alma mater, Taylor University, under Paul Patterson from 1993 to 1996. His next job was an assistant at North Carolina State under Herb Sendek from 1996 to 2000. He then moved on to Butler as an assistant to Thad Matta and was there just one season (2000–01). When Matta accepted the head coaching position at Xavier, Groce went with him and served as an assistant from 2001 to 2004, before moving again with Matta when he was named as the head coach of Ohio State. He served as an assistant from 2004 to 2008.

Ohio University

Groce was named the head coach at Ohio University on June 27, 2008, replacing Tim O'Shea, who resigned to take the head coach position at Bryant University.

In his first year, the Bobcats finished 7–9 in Mid-American Conference play and failed to qualify for postseason play. The team's overall record improved the following year, but the Bobcats finished with another 7–9 record. However, the Bobcats went on a run in the MAC tournament, winning the championship as the No. 9 seed. As a result, the Bobcats received the conference's automatic bid to the NCAA tournament. They received a No. 14 seed in the Midwest region and Groce led the Bobcats to an upset win over 3-seeded Georgetown in the First Round. They then lost in the Second Round to Tennessee.

In 2011, the Bobcats increased their conference record to 9–7 and earned a bid to the CollegeInsider.com Tournament (CIT). A first round victory over Marshall preceded a loss to East Tennessee State in the CIT Quarterfinals.

In 2012, Groce led the Bobcats to an 11–5 conference record and another MAC tournament championship. As the conference's automatic bid to the NCAA tournament, the Bobcats received a No. 13 seed. In the Tournament, Ohio defeated No. 4-seeded Michigan and No. 12-seeded South Florida to earn a trip to the Sweet Sixteen, Ohio's first trip to the Sweet Sixteen since 1964.  In the Sweet Sixteen, they pushed No. 1-seed North Carolina to overtime before losing 73–65.

In four seasons at Ohio, Groce was 85–56 overall and 34–30 in Mid-American Conference games.

University of Illinois

Groce finalized negotiations to become the men's basketball head coach at the University of Illinois on March 28, 2012, after both Shaka Smart and Brad Stevens declined interest in the position.

The Illini started 12–0 in 2013 under Groce, the best start for a first-year coach in the team's modern era. The team won the 2012 Maui Invitational by defeating Butler in the championship game. Illinois finished the year 23–13, but with a losing conference record at 8–10. The Illini did receive a bid to the NCAA tournament advancing to the Third Round (formerly known as the Second Round) before losing to No. 2-seeded Miami.

During their 2014 season, Illinois' success in the month of November improved to 21–0 under Groce. Until losing five non-conference games in the 2015–16 season, Illinois was the only program in the nation with an undefeated November record, dating back to 2011. The Illini would slip however, finishing 20–15, 7–11 in Big Ten play and failing to make the NCAA tournament. They did receive a bid to the NIT advancing to the second round.

The Illini continued to struggle in 2015, finishing 19–14, 9–9 and again failing to make the NCAA tournament. They did receive a bid to the NIT where they lost in the first round.

Before the end of their 2016 season, new Illinois AD Josh Whitman gave John Groce a vote of confidence, praising his leadership and stating that "John Groce is going to continue to be our basketball coach."  However, the Illini finished the season 15–19, 5–13.

The Illini fared better in 2017, finishing 20–15, 8–10. The team did win four in a row toward the end of the season leading to talks of an NCAA tournament bid, but a loss at Rutgers in the final regular season game likely ended their Tournament hopes. On March 11, 2017, John Groce was relieved of his duties, two days after the Illini lost its Big Ten tournament opening-round game to Michigan. Following Groce's dismissal, the Illini advanced to the NIT quarterfinals before losing to UCF. He was eventually replaced by Oklahoma State head coach Brad Underwood.

From 2013 to 2016, Groce reversed Illinois' prior four-game losing streak in the annual Braggin' Rights interstate rivalry against Missouri by winning the contest for four straight seasons.

University of Akron
Following his dismissal from Illinois, Groce was hired on April 5, 2017 to become the new head coach of the Akron Zips. In 2020, Groce's Zips won the MAC regular season title, but were not able to participate in the postseason due to the COVID pandemic.  He took the Zips to the 2022 NCAA Tournament as a 13 seed where they lost in the First Round to 4th seeded UCLA.

Head coaching record

Personal life
Groce's brother is Travis Steele, the current head coach of Miami (OH).

References

External links
 
 Akron profile
 Ohio profile
 Illinois profile

1971 births
Living people
Akron Zips men's basketball coaches
American men's basketball coaches
American men's basketball players
Basketball coaches from Indiana
Basketball players from Indiana
Butler Bulldogs men's basketball coaches
College men's basketball head coaches in the United States
Illinois Fighting Illini men's basketball coaches
NC State Wolfpack men's basketball coaches
Ohio Bobcats men's basketball coaches
Ohio State Buckeyes men's basketball coaches
Sportspeople from Muncie, Indiana
Taylor Trojans men's basketball coaches
Taylor Trojans men's basketball players
Xavier Musketeers men's basketball coaches
Taylor University alumni